KJVC (92.7 FM) is a commercial radio station airing a Classic country format. Owned and operated by Sputnik Media, LLC., the facility is licensed to Mansfield, and serves De Soto Parish, Louisiana.

References

External links

Country radio stations in the United States
Radio stations in Louisiana